The spotted skink (Oligosoma lineoocellatum) is a nationally at risk species of skink native to New Zealand. The Spotted skink is currently known to be present in the Hawkes Bay, Wairarapa and Wellington regions as well as in Nelson, Marlborough and Canterbury. It is also present on Somes Island, Mākaro / Ward Island, North Brother Island and Stephens Island. Adult males and adult females of the species significantly differ in the snout-vent length  with body sizes reaching 111mm. Females produce around 3 - 4 young.

In January 2016 a population of spotted skink were released into the protected natural reserve Zealandia.

References

External links 
 Holotype specimen of Oligosoma lineoocellatum held at the Museum of New Zealand Te Papa Tongarewa
 Image of a Spotted skink

Oligosoma
Reptiles described in 1851
Reptiles of New Zealand
Endemic fauna of New Zealand
Taxa named by Auguste Duméril
Endemic reptiles of New Zealand